Events from the year 1531 in India.

Events
 Siege of Diu (1531)

Births

Deaths
 Vallabha Acharya – founder of the Pushti sect in India,

See also

 Timeline of Indian history

References

 
India